This article lists all of the station stops made by the American Freedom Train tour in 1975 and 1976.

1975

April 1975
 April 1 - Wilmington, Delaware
 April 6 - Albany, New York
 April 11 - Burlington, Vermont
 April 14 - White River Junction, Vermont
 April 14 - Manchester, New Hampshire
 April 17 - Portland, Maine
 April 20 - Boston, Massachusetts
 April 29 - Lowell, Massachusetts

May 1975
 May 3 - Worcester, Massachusetts
 May 7 - Rochester, New York
 May 14 - Cleveland, Ohio
 May 22 - Columbus, Ohio

June 1975
 June 4 - Cincinnati, Ohio
 June 14 - Archbold, Ohio
 June 17 - Fort Wayne, Indiana
 June 19 - Dayton, Ohio
 June 21 - Detroit, Michigan

July 1975
 July 5 - Detroit, Michigan
 July 8 - Grand Rapids, Michigan
 July 11 - Kalamazoo, Michigan
 July 14 - South Bend, Indiana
 July 18 - Peoria, Illinois
 July 23 - Springfield, Illinois
 July 28 - Chicago, Illinois

August 1975
 August 5 - Crystal Lake, Illinois
 August 8 - Rockford, Illinois
 August 12 - Aurora, Illinois
 August 15 - Green Bay, Wisconsin
 August 20 - Madison, Wisconsin
 August 26 - Minneapolis, Minnesota

September 1975
 September 1 - Fargo, North Dakota
 September 7 - Sioux Falls, South Dakota
 September 12 - Sioux City, Iowa
 September 16 - Des Moines, Iowa
 September 23 - Omaha, Nebraska

October 1975
 October 2 - Colorado Springs, Colorado
 October 7 - Cheyenne, Wyoming
 October 10 - Billings, Montana
 October 15 - Salt Lake City, Utah
 October 19 - Ogden, Utah
 October 22 - Boise, Idaho
 October 26 - Spokane, Washington
 October 31 - Seattle, Washington

November 1975
 November 5 - Tacoma, Washington
 November 11 - Portland, Oregon
 November 15 - Salem, Oregon
 November 19 - Springfield, Oregon
 November 24 - Reno, Nevada/Sparks, Nevada
 November 28 - Sacramento, California

December 1975
 December 1 - Stockton, California
 December 5 - Oakland, California
 December 10 - San Francisco, California
 December 14 - San Jose, California
 December 19 - Fresno, California
 December 23 - Pomona, California

1976

January 1976
 January 2 - Santa Barbara, California
 January 5 - Long Beach, California
 January 9 - Anaheim, California
 January 14 - San Diego, California
 January 19 - San Juan Capistrano, California
 January 22 - Yuma, Arizona
 January 24 - Tempe, Arizona
 January 29 - Tucson, Arizona

February 1976
 February 3 - Albuquerque, New Mexico
 February 6 - El Paso, Texas/Fabens, Texas
 February 7 - Odessa, Texas/Midland, Texas
 February 11 - San Antonio, Texas
 February 15 - Austin, Texas
 February 19 - Houston, Texas
 February 26 - Fort Worth, Texas
 February 29 - Dallas, Texas

March 1976
 March 6 - Wichita Falls, Texas
 March 10 - Oklahoma City, Oklahoma
 March 15 - Tulsa, Oklahoma
 March 19 - Wichita, Kansas
 March 24 - Topeka, Kansas
 March 27 - Kansas City, Kansas
 March 31 - Jefferson City, Missouri

April 1976
 April 4 - St. Louis, Missouri
 April 13 - North Little Rock, Arkansas
 April 17 - Memphis, Tennessee
 April 24 - Jackson, Mississippi
 April 28 - Baton Rouge, Louisiana

May 1976
 May 3 - New Orleans, Louisiana
 May 11 - Mobile, Alabama
 May 15 - Columbus, Georgia
 May 19 - Atlanta, Georgia
 May 27 - Birmingham, Alabama
 May 31 - Huntsville, Alabama

June 1976
 June 4 - Knoxville, Tennessee
 June 7 - Chattanooga, Tennessee
 June 12 - Lexington, Kentucky
 June 15 - Evansville, Indiana
 June 19 - Dayton, Ohio
 June 23 - Huntington, West Virginia
 June 25 - South Charleston, West Virginia
 June 29 - Cumberland, Maryland

July 1976
 July 2 - Harrisburg, Pennsylvania
 July 7 - Pittsburgh, Pennsylvania
 July 11 - Brackenridge, Pennsylvania
 July 13 - Lock Haven, Pennsylvania
 July 14 - Williamsport, Pennsylvania
 July 17 - Binghamton, New York
 July 19 - Scranton, Pennsylvania
 July 23 - Morristown, New Jersey
 July 27 - New York, New York

August 1976

 August 3 - Milford, Connecticut
 August 6 - Providence, Rhode Island
 August 10 - New London, Connecticut
 August 13 - Meriden, Connecticut
 August 17 - Tarrytown, New York
 August 21 - Newark, New Jersey
 August 24 - New Brunswick, New Jersey
 August 27 - Bethlehem, Pennsylvania
 August 30 - Trenton, New Jersey

September 1976
 September 2 - Asbury Park, New Jersey
 September 8 - Atlantic City, New Jersey
 September 12 - King of Prussia, Pennsylvania
 September 17 - Baltimore, Maryland
 September 21 - Hagerstown, Maryland
 September 25 - Washington, D.C.
 September 30 - Newport News, Virginia

October 1976
 October 5 - Norfolk, Virginia
 October 8 - Richmond, Virginia
 October 15 - Fredericksburg, Virginia
 October 18 - Danville, Virginia
 October 20 - Greensboro, North Carolina
 October 25 - Charlotte, North Carolina
 October 29 - Raleigh, North Carolina

November 1976
 November 3 - Greenville, South Carolina
 November 6 - Columbia, South Carolina
 November 9 - Florence, South Carolina
 November 12 - Charleston, South Carolina
 November 16 - Savannah, Georgia
 November 20 - Jacksonville, Florida
 November 26 - Tallahassee, Florida
 November 30 - Gainesville, Florida

December 1976
 December 3 - Orlando, Florida
 December 7 - Sarasota, Florida
 December 11 - St. Petersburg, Florida
 December 16 - Lakeland, Florida
 December 21 - West Palm Beach, Florida
 December 26 - Miami, Florida

References
 Timeline for the 1975-1976 American Freedom Train, retrieved December 23, 2004.

1975 in the United States
1976 in the United States
History of rail transportation in the United States